Ylo may refer to:
Naruo language (ISO 639:ylo), Loloish language cluster spoken by the Yi people of Yunnan, China
Yellow Pages Limited (traded as TSX:YLO until 2012), Canadian directory company
Ilo, Peru (sometimes Ylo in older sources), port city in Peru

See also
Ilo (disambiguation)